HMS Pembroke was a 74-gun third rate ship of the line of the Royal Navy, launched on 27 June 1812 at Blackwall Yard.

Pembroke was driven ashore near Portsmouth in late December 1812 .

The squadron silenced the fort's guns, and attacked 20 vessels; 4 were captured, and the cargoes of another 15 taken off ships whose crews scuttled them.

In 1836 Pembroke formed part of an experimental squadron, which were groups of ships sent out in the 1830s and 1840s to test new techniques of ship design, armament, building, and propulsion. In March 1837, she was driven ashore at Gibraltar, but she later was refloated with assistance from the French steamship Minos.

Pembroke was fitted with screw propulsion in 1855. On 16 September 1857, she ran down and sank the British brig Lady Sale off the Isle of May. The Admiralty Court found Pembroke to blame for the collision. She was transferred to the Coastguard in 1858, and used as a base ship from 1887. She was renamed HMS Forte as a receiving hulk in 1890, and was eventually sold out of the navy in 1905.

Notes

Citations

Publications

Lavery, Brian (2003) The Ship of the Line - Volume 1: The development of the battlefleet 1650-1850. Conway Maritime Press. .

External links
 

Ships of the line of the Royal Navy
Vengeur-class ships of the line
1812 ships
Ships built by the Blackwall Yard
Maritime incidents in 1812
Maritime incidents in March 1837